Kutuzov is a Russian masculine surname, its feminine counterpart is Kutuzova. It may refer to:

Alexander Kutuzov (born 1985), Russian hockey player
Alexey Kutuzov (1748—1791), Russian mystic and alchemist
Arseny Golenishchev-Kutuzov (1848–1913), Russian poet
Danil Kutuzov (born 1987), Russian futsal player
Ilya Golenishchev-Kutuzov (1904–1969), Russian philologist, poet and translator
Mikhail Kutuzov (1745–1813), Russian field marshal during Napoleonic era
Natalia Kutuzova (born 1975), Russian water polo player
Roman Kutuzov, several people
Viktoriya Kutuzova (born 1988), Ukrainian tennis player 
Vitali Kutuzov (born 1980), Belarusian soccer player

Russian-language surnames